Mikhail Ivanovich Senyurin (born 24 November 1948) is a Russian professional football coach and a former player.

Senyurin played in the Soviet First League with FC Volga Gorky.

External links
Profile at Footballfacts.ru

1948 births
Living people
Soviet footballers
Russian football managers
Association football forwards
FC Volga Nizhny Novgorod players
FC Khimik Dzerzhinsk players